Linda Thompson (April 26, 1953 – May 10, 2009), born Linda Diane Capps, was an American lawyer and militia movement supporter. In 1993, she quit her job as a lawyer in Indianapolis, Indiana, to start the American Justice Federation, a non-profit group that promoted pro-gun causes through a shortwave radio program, a computer bulletin board system, and sales of its newsletter and videos.

Black helicopters and FEMA camp allegations
She made a third film in 1994, America Under Siege accusing the government of using "black helicopters" against patriots, and the Federal Emergency Management Agency (FEMA) of establishing concentration camps, facilities she claimed were to prevent patriots from interfering with plans to establish a "New World Order". The supposed FEMA Camp was the Beech Grove Shops, an Amtrak repair facility in Beech Grove, Indiana.

Proposed march on Washington
In 1994 Thompson declared herself "Acting Adjutant General" of the "Unorganized Militia of the United States" and announced plans for an armed march on Washington, D.C. in September of that year. She declared that militiamen would arrest and try for treason in "Citizen's Courts" those Congressional representatives not living up to their oath of office. The proposed march was almost immediately denounced by groups on the right wing, including the John Birch Society, and Thompson subsequently canceled the march. Later, she was arrested for blocking a Presidential motorcade in Indianapolis. She carried one weapon concealed and also had one in her purse. Both guns were legal and no charges were filed.

Death
Thompson died in St. Petersburg, Florida on May 10, 2009 after overdosing on medication. Her ashes were scattered in the Gulf of Mexico by her husband, in accordance with her last wishes.

The medication was posted to her by the United States Department of Veterans Affairs (VA). A lawsuit was lodged on the grounds Thompson had a history of depression and suicidal threats since 2005, but was still mailed a three-month supply of painkillers. Thompson's brother, Stephen Capps, said that the VA should have known better than to send her that much medication.

See also

Waco siege
List of conspiracy theories
Militia organizations in the United States
Patriot movement

References

1953 births
2009 deaths
20th-century American lawyers
Accidental deaths in Florida
American gun rights activists
American conspiracy theorists
Drug-related deaths in Florida
Indiana lawyers
Patriot movement
Waco siege
Whitewater controversy
20th-century American women lawyers